Yevhen Vitaliyovych Yemayev (born 25 July 1999) is a Ukrainian professional footballer who plays as a left midfielder for Ukrainian club Ahrobiznes Volochysk.

References

External links
 Profile on Ahrobiznes Volochysk official website
 

1999 births
Living people
People from Volochysk
Ukrainian footballers
Association football midfielders
FC Ahrobiznes Volochysk players
Ukrainian First League players
Sportspeople from Khmelnytskyi Oblast